Cuscus ( or ) is the common name generally given to the species within the four genera of Australasian possum of the family Phalangeridae with the most tropical distribution:

 Ailurops 
 Phalanger 
 Spilocuscus 
 Strigocuscus

The name is also applied in parts of Indonesia to the Sunda slow loris, where people do not distinguish this from the "kuskus" possums. Note however, that the loris, being a primate, is unrelated to the other cuscus species. Cuscus are marsupials, even though they have some appearances, traits and attributes like those of lemurs of Madagascar, which are prosimians, due to convergent evolution.

See also 
 Reduplication

Further reads 

 New Species of Cuscus. N.p., n.p, 1900.
 Image, Cool. Cuscus Journal: 150 Page Lined Notebook/Diary. N.p., CreateSpace Publishing Platform, 2016.
 Salas, Leonardo A.. Comparative Ecology and Behavior of the Mountain Cuscus (Phalanger Carmelitae), Silky Cuscus (Phalanger Sericeus) and Coppery Ringtail (Pseudochirops Cupreus) at Mt. Stolle, Papua New Guinea. N.p., University of Massachusetts at Amherst, 2002.
 Nowak, Ronald M.. Walker's Marsupials of the World. United States, Johns Hopkins University Press, 2005.

References 

Mammal common names
Possums